Abdullah Kazim (Arabic:عبد الله كاظم; born 31 July 1996) is an Emirati association football player who plays for Al Bataeh.

References

External links
 

Emirati footballers
1996 births
Living people
Al-Wasl F.C. players
Hatta Club players
Sharjah FC players
Al Bataeh Club players
UAE Pro League players
Association football wingers